Protestantism is the largest religious demographic in the United Kingdom, prominent branches being Anglicanism, the Reformed tradition (including Presbyterianism), Methodism, Pentecostalism, and Baptists.

For centuries, Protestantism has played a crucial role in shaping political and religious life throughout the region. The Protestant Reformation began in the early 16th century with Martin Luther, a German monk and philosopher. It developed further on the island of Great Britain, especially in England, and produced many notable figures. Protestantism influenced many of England's monarchs in the 16th and 17th centuries, including Henry VIII, Edward VI, Elizabeth I, and James I. Violence was commonplace, and persecution was frequent for followers whose faith differed from that of the reigning monarch. Reformers and early church leaders were persecuted in the first centuries of the Reformation, but the non-conformist movement survived nonetheless. As a result of the Reformation, Protestantism is the most widely practiced religion in the modern United Kingdom, even though participation in the church has declined in recent years.

United Kingdom before the Reformation

Before Protestantism reached England, the Roman Catholic Church was the established state church. Scotland, Wales and Ireland were also closely tied to Roman Catholicism.

Early Reformation
In Catholic England, the only Bible available was written in Latin Vulgate, a translation of proper Latin considered holy by the Roman Catholic Church. As a result, only clergy had access to copies of the Bible. Countrymen were dependent on their local priests for the reading of scripture because they could not read the text for themselves. Early in the Reformation, one of the fundamental disagreements between the Roman Church and Protestant leaders was over the distribution of the Bible in the people's common language.

John Wycliffe helped make the Bible available to all people, regardless of their wealth or social standing. Wycliffe translated the whole Bible into the English language because he believed that Englishmen needed to be familiar with the scriptures on their own terms in order to know Jesus Christ.

In 1526, William Tyndale published the first complete Bible in print. This facilitated distribution at a lower cost, and soon the Bible was not only readable to English citizens, but also affordable for most people. Once the common people had access to the Bible, many more joined the Protestant Church. The rapid growth in biblical reading was a notable event of the Reformation, and England was one of the first countries where this occurred. Soon, England's foundational convictions were changing, and several new Protestant doctrines were emerging that challenged the Roman Catholic Church.

Leading reformers and philosophers of the time, such as Wycliffe, helped establish these doctrines by preaching to large groups of people. Wycliffe, among others, opposed the Catholic belief of transubstantiation. Catholics believe that when they participate in the Eucharist, the bread and wine transform into the literal body and blood of Jesus Christ when the priest prays over it. All Protestant leaders rejected this belief as false.

Many Protestant leaders also disapproved of Catholic monasticism because they believed it was unnecessary for salvation and harmful to those who practised it. The practice of penance and the belief that good works could balance the punishment of sin or lead to salvation were particularly common among the monks living in monasteries. Protestants rejected this doctrine, believing that good works alone could not allow one to enter heaven. Rather, Protestants rely on the doctrines of sola scriptura, sola fide and sola gratia.

Protestant influence on politics

Monarchs 
During the 16th and 17th centuries, nearly all the monarchs and resulting governments of Scotland, Ireland, and England were defined by either Catholicism or Protestantism.

Henry VIII was the first monarch to introduce a new state religion to the English. In 1532, he wanted to have his marriage to his wife, Catherine of Aragon, annulled. When Pope Clement VII refused to consent to the annulment, Henry VIII decided to separate the entire country of England from the Roman Catholic Church. The Pope had no more authority over the people of England; this parting of ways allowed for Protestantism to enter the country.

Henry VIII established the Church of England after his split with the Pope. However, England stayed much the same, even with the new state religion. Its doctrines and practices were, at first, very similar to those of the Catholic Church. The king did not establish the Church of England as a result of religious differences with Catholicism; his motives were mainly political, and he persecuted radical Protestants who threatened his church.

Henry VIII's successor, Edward VI, supported the Reformation, but his belief in Protestantism was not only political. He was more devout in his faith, and persecution of Protestant subjects ceased.

Under Queen Mary I, however, Protestants were persecuted once again. She was raised Catholic, and saw it as her duty to purge the evil of Protestantism from her country. During her reign, reformers of the church, such as Thomas Hawkes, Hugh Latimer, Nicholas Ridley, Thomas Cranmer, and George Wishart, were executed for their faith. These executions did not heavily hinder the Protestant movement. In fact, many joined the church when they saw how committed these martyrs were to their religion.

The next monarch, Elizabeth I, was a Protestant. Under her rule, the Protestant Church flourished. Protestants now filled many leadership positions in government. With this new power, however, came the persecution of many Catholics. Similarities between the Catholic and Protestant churches steadily decreased during this time.

The reign of King James I established a certain future for Protestantism in England. The King James Bible introduced a new Protestant form of the Bible to church members throughout the country. This translation was in a language and dialect specific to the English people and to their Protestant religion. James I fulfilled the efforts of Protestant reformers who had been supporting the distribution of Bibles in common language for decades.

Political events 
The English Civil War (1642–1651) was largely influenced by the Protestant Reformation. While England struggled between Catholicism and Protestantism, Scotland was experiencing a significant impact from the Reformation and its ideas. A strong Presbyterian following had developed, but the Church of Scotland did not agree with King Charles I's expectations of the Protestant religion. 

Oliver Cromwell, an English MP born in Huntingdon, emerged victorious at the end of the Civil War. Once he gained control of England, Cromwell established a radical religious government. He organized the Assembly of Saints, a firm and strict sect of Protestantism that was very similar to Puritanism. The Assembly remained strong in England until the reign of Charles II, who ended many of the strict practices of Puritanism.

When Parliament passed the Act of Toleration of 1689, dissenters received freedom of worship within England. Catholics were not included in this act of Parliament, but members of other religions, most notably Protestantism, were officially protected from persecution based on their faith.

Protestantism in other countries of the United Kingdom

Northern Ireland 
Although Northern Ireland is considered more Protestant than the Republic of Ireland, it has still retained more Catholics than other nations in the United Kingdom. The Presbyterian Church in Ireland and the Church of Scotland have been closely tied in the past.

Scotland 
Scotland experienced a much deeper movement of Protestant reformation than any other nation in the UK. John Knox is credited with introducing the Reformation to Scotland. Knox sparked the Scottish Reformation in 1560 when he began preaching about Protestantism to large groups of people throughout the country. Later on, Scotland became involved in the English Civil War when Charles I threatened the country's Presbyterian Church.

Wales 
Wales became a part of England when the Tudor dynasty passed the Laws in Wales Acts 1536 and 1542. The religious and political histories of Wales and England were closely tied during the reign of the Tudor monarchs, and the impact of the Reformation in both nations was similar. In 1588, William Morgan published the Welsh Bible. Welsh is the only non-state language in which the entire Bible was published during the Protestant Reformation. For the most part, faithful Catholics made it more difficult for radical Protestantism to advance in the country. However, Protestants and non-conformists still compose the largest religious group in Wales.

Protestantism in the United Kingdom today
Statistics show a steady decline in church membership and attendance in the United Kingdom. According to the BBC, church attendance in the UK has dwindled in the past 50 years, not just in the Church of England or other Protestant churches, but in all Christian establishments. The BBC reported in 2011 that 26% of people over the age of 65 attend church, as opposed to 11% of those between the ages of 16 and 44.

Britannica Online says that the Church of England has more members than other churches, but there is greater dedication among members of non-conformist congregations. The Office for National Statistics confirmed in its 2001 census that 15% of people in England do not claim any religion. Research in 2005 concluded that the number of citizens who belonged to a religion and attended services at any church had decreased by 41% in 41 years, while those who said they did not belong to any religion and did not attend services increased by 35% in the same amount of time. These numbers point to the increasing secularization of the country. According to the 31st British Social Attitudes Survey, the percentage of people identifying as Church of England/Anglican has fallen from 27% in 2003 to 16% in 2013, a drop of 59%. The number of people who say they have no religion has increased by more than 16%, from 43% to 50%, overtaking the proportion of people who claim a religious affiliation. The report also noted that Catholics accounted for 9% of the population and "other Christians" for 16%.

Scotland has long been dominated by Presbyterianism. Today, the Church of Scotland is weakening as a state church, and church membership in the country is declining. According to research in the city of Dundee, only 10% of church members attend services regularly.

Although the majority of citizens in Wales are members of Protestant and non-conformist churches, the culture has become increasingly secular. Roman Catholics are a growing minority.

Northern Ireland is now one of the most diverse regions in the UK. Catholicism is still the largest single church in Northern Ireland, but Presbyterians total one-fifth of the population. The Church of Ireland accounts for about one-sixth of the population.

See also
 Conservative evangelicalism in the United Kingdom
 Anti-Catholicism in the United Kingdom

References

 
United Kingdom